|- style="vertical-align: top;"

SWEEPS-10 is an extrasolar planet that, from June 2007 to August 2011, was the planet candidate with the shortest orbital period yet found, until PSR J1719-1438 b was discovered in 2011 with an even shorter orbit. The planet orbits the star SWEEPS J175902.00−291323.7 located in the Galactic bulge at a distance of approximately 22,000 light years from Earth (based on a distance modulus of 14.1).

It completes an orbit of its star (designated SWEEPS J175902.00−291323.7) in just 10 hours, and is categorized as an ultra-short period planet (USPP). Located only 1.2 million kilometers from its star (roughly three times the distance between the Earth and the Moon), the planet is among the hottest ever detected; its estimated temperature is approximately 1,650 degrees Celsius. "This star-hugging planet must be at least 1.6 times the mass of Jupiter, otherwise the star's gravitational muscle would pull the planet apart," said team leader Kailash Sahu of the Space Telescope Science Institute in Baltimore, Maryland. Such USPPs seem to occur only around dwarf stars.

The small star's relatively low temperature allows the planet to exist. "USPPs occur preferentially around normal red dwarf stars that are smaller and cooler than our Sun," Sahu said.

See also
SWEEPS stands for Sagittarius Window Eclipsing Extrasolar Planet Search
SWEEPS-04
SWEEPS-11

References

  (web Preprint)

External links
 SWEEPS-10 at exoplanet.eu 

Sagittarius (constellation)
Exoplanet candidates
Transiting exoplanets
Hot Jupiters
Giant planets
Exoplanets discovered in 2006
Sagittarius Window Eclipsing Extrasolar Planet Search